Luwati (Al-Lawatia, ; also known as Khoja, Khojki, Lawatiyya, Lawatiya, or Hyderabadi) is an Indo-Aryan language spoken by 5,000 to 10,000 people known as the Lawatiya (also called the Khojas or Hyderabadis) in the country of Oman. In total it has been estimated there are 20,000 to 30,000 Lawatiya people. Despite the various names, the Lawatiya refer to the language as Khojki. It is considered an endangered language because a portion of the Lawatiya do not speak Luwati, and it is not continuously passed down to younger generations.

Geographic distribution and status 
The Luwati language is superficially similar to Kutchi, but retains sounds found in other Sindhi languages and Saraiki but that have been lost from Kutchi. Luwati also bears similarities to other languages such as Sindhi, Kachichi, Gujarati, Hindustani and Persian. As with other languages located in Oman, Luwati is influenced by the Omani dialect of Arabic.

Originating from the Pakistani province of Sindh, the Luwati language has had a presence in Oman for nearly four centuries. The language and people were first mentioned historically by the Omani historian Ibn Ruzayq. The Lawatiya appeared to have settled in Oman in waves of immigration from Sindh between 1780 and 1880 bringing the language with them. A number of historians assign an Arab pedigree to the Luwatis. The Luwati speakers inhabited the Arabian Peninsula until their displacement during the 8th century C.E. Others assert that the Luwati speakers originate in Hydrabad. The Luwatis entered Muscat as prosperous merchants and insularized themselves, for the most part, in Sūr al-Luwātiyya in Muttrah, preserving their language.

Luwati is a minority language found in Oman specifically in the capital of Muscat as well as in the coastal towns of Saham, Barka, Khabura, and Musana. It is spoken by 5,000 to 10,000 people.

Phonology 

Luwati phonology is simpler than that of Sindhi, having lost the breathy-voiced consonants and simplified the vowel system. All of the implosives, however, are retained.

Vowels

Consonants

Writing system 
Luwati no longer has a writing system and is only a spoken language. Its script was used by Nizari Ismailis in Punjab, Sindh, and Gujarat to produce a religious corpus.

References

Languages of Oman
Western Indo-Aryan languages
Sindhi language